Sala Burton (née Galante; April 1, 1925 – February 1, 1987) was a Polish-born American politician who served as a United States Representative from California from 1983 until her death from colon cancer in Washington, D. C., in 1987.

Early life and education 
She was born Sala Galante into a Jewish family in Białystok, Poland, on April 1, 1925. The family immigrated to the US in 1939, before the German invasion of Poland, and she attended public schools in San Francisco and then the University of San Francisco.

Career
She was the associate director of the California Public Affairs Institute from 1948 to 1950. She was the vice president of the California Democratic Council from 1951 to 1954. She served as president of the San Francisco Democratic Women's Forum from 1957 to 1959.

Burton served as a delegate to Democratic National Conventions, 1956, 1976, 1980, and 1984. She was elected as a Democrat to the 98th Congress by special election on June 21, 1983, to fill the vacancy caused by the death of her husband, United States Representative Phillip Burton.

She was reelected to the two succeeding Congress terms and mentored her successor and future Speaker Nancy Pelosi, who replaced Burton after her death in 1987.

Personal life
Galante married Irving Lipschultz. Together, they had one daughter, Joy. They divorced in 1951. Galante met her second husband Phillip Burton at a California Young Democrats convention in 1950. They were married from 1953 until Phillip Burton's death in 1983. They raised her daughter, Joy, together. Phillip & Sala Burton High School, on the site of the former Woodrow Wilson High School in San Francisco, is named after the couple.

Death and succession
Burton died from colon cancer on February 1, 1987, in Washington, D.C., and was buried in the San Francisco National Cemetery in the Presidio. She was succeeded in the resultant special election in the 5th congressional district by Nancy Pelosi, who has represented similar California districts ever since.

See also 
 List of Jewish members of the United States Congress
 List of United States Congress members who died in office (1950–99)
 Women in the United States House of Representatives

References

External links 

1925 births
People from Białystok
1987 deaths
Deaths from cancer in Washington, D.C.
Deaths from colorectal cancer
University of San Francisco alumni
Jewish members of the United States House of Representatives
Jewish women politicians
Polish emigrants to the United States
American people of Polish-Jewish descent
Women in California politics
Democratic Party members of the United States House of Representatives from California
Spouses of California politicians
Female members of the United States House of Representatives
20th-century American politicians
20th-century American women politicians
Politicians from San Francisco
20th-century American Jews